Kim beş yüz bin ister? (English translation:Who wants five hundred thousand?) was a Turkish game show based on the original British format of Who Wants to Be a Millionaire?.

The show was hosted by the Turkish actor Kenan Işık and earlier by the Turkish actor Haluk Bilginer. The main goal of the game was to win YTL 500,000 by answering 15 multiple-choice questions correctly. There were three lifelines - fifty fifty, phone a friend and ask the audience. It was shown on Show TV.

Money tree

References

External links
Official website (archived)

Who Wants to Be a Millionaire?
Turkish game shows
2005 Turkish television series debuts
2007 Turkish television series endings
Show TV original programming